Bill Allcorn was Texas Land Commissioner in the late 1950s.

Allcorn was from Brownwood, Texas.  In February 1958, Governor Price Daniel appointed Allcorn as Texas Land Commissioner when James Earl Rudder was appointed Vice President of Texas A&M University.  Allcorn was elected to one two-year term in 1958 and was succeeded by Jerry Sadler in 1961. Allcorn died on August 24, 1962 at the age of 38.

References

Commissioners of the General Land Office of Texas
Texas Democrats
Year of birth missing
1962 deaths